Sharnael Wolverton is an American author, minister, and television host.

She was born in Montana but currently resides in Louisiana.  She ministers internationally as the founder of Swiftfire Ministries International. Her books include "The Science Of Miracles", "Keys to Third Heaven", " The Seers Handbook" and "Spiritual Reflections of a Montana Girl in a Louisiana State." Her television show is called "Swiftfire with Sharnael Wolverton."

She sells pendants advertised as "EMF and 5G body shields" with prices going from 40 USD to 375 USD for a set, as well as a "zapper" that "introduces negative ions through the skin and into the body’s living tissue, killing the parasites by reversing their polarity".

Published books
Seers Handbook (Swiftfire Publishing, 2007) 
Keys to Third Heaven: Using Third Heaven Revelation to Impact a World (Swiftfire Publishing, 2007) 
Spiritual Reflections of a Montana Girl in a Louisiana State (Swiftfire Publishing, 2009)

References

External links
Seer's Handbook at Amazon

Year of birth missing (living people)
Living people
American spiritual writers